Andy Capp is a British comic strip created by cartoonist Reg Smythe, seen in the Daily Mirror and the Sunday Mirror newspapers since 5 August 1957. Originally a single-panel cartoon, it was later expanded to four panels.

The strip is syndicated internationally by Creators Syndicate. The character is also licensed as the mascot for a line of snack foods (Andy Capp's fries).

Characters and story

Andy (short for Andrew) Capp
Florrie "Flo" Capp (named after Florence Nightingale)
Chalkie White
Ruby "Rube" White
Percy Ritson, the rent collector
Jackie the barman
The Vicar
Flo's Mum (never seen)
Minor recurring characters include various constables, barmaids, barmen, referees, footballers, pub locals, door-to-door salesmen, debt collectors, job centre employees, and Guitar Bob.

Andy is a working-class figure who never actually works, living in Hartlepool, a harbour town in County Durham, in North East England. The title of the strip is a pun on the local pronunciation of "handicap"; and the surname Capp signifies how Andy's cap always covered his eyes along with, metaphorically, his vision in life. Handicap racing and handicapping, in sport and games, is part of betting, a favourite activity of Andy Capp.

Andy's hobbies and activities include pigeon racing, darts, snooker (his cue's name is Delilah), playing football (which always involves fights with the other players, and frequently ends with Andy being sent off), occasional cricket and rugby, betting on horses (and usually losing badly), getting drunk in the local pub (often falling into the canal and being fished out by a constable, and usually arriving home late as a result), ending up in the local jail, fishing (and not catching anything bigger than a goldfish), unsuccessfully mooching money from everyone for beer, unsuccessfully flirting with barmaids (also yelling at them when he is not served), attempting to pick up (mostly young) bargirls (and being rejected usually due to his age), loafing and napping on the sofa, playing poker (and usually cheating with hidden cards, although plainly seen by the readers), and fighting with his long-suffering wife Florrie (also known as "Flo"), as well as being served burnt food by her.

Andy's iconic checked flat cap is always pulled down over his eyes, even when he is napping or bathing. He is often unshaven, frequently intoxicated (indicated by a prominent red nose and dishevelled clothing), lazy, freeloading, belligerent, and confrontational, but just as frequently lovable (he always refers to Flo as "pet", and will instantly "bop" anyone who dares to be rude to her). Until the 1980s he was often seen with a cigarette dangling from his lip. When Andy gave up smoking in 1983 some readers blamed political correctness. However, Fergus McKenna, head of syndication at Trinity Mirror which publishes the Daily Mirror, denied that the newspaper had put pressure on Smythe to change Andy's habits, saying: "The truth is that Reg himself gave up smoking and he said there was no way Andy was going to carry on enjoying cigarettes when Reg couldn't". ,. Andy and Florrie now attend marriage counselling.

Andy and Florrie are always on the verge of poverty. Although Flo works regularly as a charwoman, Andy is unemployed and lacks motivation. Rent on their terraced house and its contents is constantly in arrears, and the rent collector, Percy Ritson, despairs of ever being paid. He, as well as several others, always nag Andy to get himself a job, which is usually met with him clobbering them.

Percy is also always confronting Andy on the way he treats Flo. It's obvious Percy has a crush on Flo and believes he would treat her far better than Andy does. This has led the two men to fight.

Their furniture has been repossessed on several occasions. Somehow they always manage to retrieve it, and Andy is always able to afford beer and gambling money, usually by borrowing from Florrie.

Almost all the characters occasionally "break the fourth wall" by delivering asides directly to the reader, or even as a very terse 'thought bubble', usually referring to Andy's low character, but more regularly by a character simply cutting their eyes to the reader in the final panel whenever something is said or done by Andy that the character finds unbelievable. The 24 October 1972 strip revealed that Andy once worked as a sign painter, but had not worked at that trade (or any other) for many years. Should anyone suggest he get a job, his response is often very terse and along the lines of 'Don't be so ridiculous!' and sometimes leads to fisticuffs.

He occasionally visits the Job Centre (Labour Exchange) and is sometimes shown finding excuses why he cannot take a job that seems suitable for him, preferring instead to collect his "dole money" (government unemployment assistance). On more than one occasion, it is mentioned that Andy had been in the army (with the Royal Northumberland Fusiliers, Reg Smythe's regiment) and was a World War II veteran of the North African campaign. According to Don Markstein,

The strip takes place almost exclusively in one of three locations: the pub, the street, or inside the Capps' residence at 37 Durham Street (generally with Andy on the couch and Florrie yelling from the next room). Less-frequently visited places include the racetrack (although Andy frequently bets by listening to the radio, thus saving him the trip), the marriage counsellor, and the football pitch (where Andy is either fighting, quarrelling, being sent off, or carried off on a stretcher).

Andy's and Flo's best friends are their neighbours Chalkie and Rube White. Chalkie is a hard-drinking working-class type like Andy, who can often be seen sharing a pint with him at the corner pub, but Chalkie seems mellower than Andy, and more tolerant of his wife. Rube is Flo's confidante, and the two often trade gossip over the clothesline about their husbands' latest escapades. The local vicar is also often seen. Andy despairs of his holier-than-thou attitude, as he is constantly criticising Andy for his many bad habits and vice-ridden lifestyle. He often lets his opinion be known to Flo, who agrees with his low assessment of Andy's character.

At times, Flo will forcibly remove Andy from the pub when she feels he has been there for far too long (even at times, missing his tea meal). When he comes home, especially in the earlier strips, Flo often confronted him about his doings, sometimes striking him with either her fist or anything she could grab, i.e.: a rolling pin, cricket bat or something similar with the intent to clobber him. However, Flo is not without her own vices. She (along with Rube) will go to bingo with the same frequency as Andy goes to the pub.

Whenever this happened (also mainly in the earlier strips), the roles are then reversed, with Andy usually confronting Flo for being late from going to bingo and sometimes striking her with either his fist or chasing her out the door with a push broom or a chair with the intent to clobber her with said object.

She had also lost cleaning jobs due to her being bingo mad.

Flo is also not a very good cook, regularly burning the meals with her lack of cooking skills. This often sends Andy into a rage and off to the nearest café for a meal.

Flo's mother, an unseen character whose dialogue appears from out of frame, often chimes into the conversation, mostly with sarcastic criticism of her son-in-law (her feet and legs appear in one panel where she has passed out after Andy offers her too much to drink). Flo's "mam", whom Andy addresses only as "Missus", is often the subject of Andy's pointed barbs about her weight and less-than-sunny disposition, but she has been known to give as good as she gets. Andy's mother was similarly mentioned and also delivered dialogue from offstage, but her "appearances" were cut back significantly as the years passed. Andy's father has also been mentioned. Flo has an older sister named Polly who is seen once, and never-seen brother. Andy had a pet whippet, Nancy, and has always kept pigeons.

Two of the constables who observe Andy's drunken behavior are named Alan and Trevor.

Continuation

Reg Smythe died on 13 June 1998, but the original strip has continued. For some time, the writer and artist were uncredited, but in November 2004 the strip began to carry a credit for Roger Mahoney (artist) and Roger Kettle (writer). Circa 2011, Kettle discontinued his work on the strip and was replaced by Lawrence Goldsmith and Sean Garnett, while Mahoney continues to draw. The appearance of the characters has not changed perceptibly since Smythe's death.

Towards the end of 2020, Mahoney's credit began to be left off strips with a subtle but noticeably different style in both lettering and art. This led to at least one industry source inferring that Mahoney, at 87 years of age, and 65 years of cartooning, had retired. Mahoney died at 89, on November 29th 2022. 

Strips into 2021 and beyond only show credits for writers Goldsmith and Garnett and continue the subtly different style.

Animated appearances

In May 2012, Andy Capp (as well as Flo, Chalkie White, the Vicar, and Jackie the Barman) appeared as an animated series for the first time in promotional material for The Trinity Mirror-owned MirrorBingo.com website. The animation was created by Teesside-born Chris Hunneysett, who drew from his own background to place Andy Capp in Middlesbrough. Andy Capp had previously appeared in animated form in television adverts for the Post Office (1986) and Kit Kat (1991).

Awards

Smythe received the National Cartoonists Society's Humor Comic Strip Award for the strip in 1974.

A statue of Andy Capp was erected in Hartlepool on 28 June 2007. It was sculpted by Jane Robbins.

Book collections and reprints

United Kingdom
(All titles by Reg Smythe. Published by Daily Mirror Books/Mirror Group Publishers unless otherwise noted)

The Andy Capp Book (No. 1) (1958)
Andy Capp Spring Tonic (No. 2) (1959)
Life with Andy Capp (No. 3) (1959)
The Andy Capp Spring Collection (No. 4) (1960)
The Best of Andy Capp (No. 5) (1960)
Laugh with Andy Capp (No. 6) (1961)
The World of Andy Capp (No. 7) (1961)
More Andy Capp (No. 8) (1962)
Andy Capp (No. 9)
Andy Capp Picks His Favourites (No. 10) (1963)
Happy Days with Andy Capp (No. 11) (1963)
Laugh at Life with Andy Capp (No. 12) (1964)
Andy Capp and Florrie (No. 13) (1964)
All the Best from Andy Capp (No. 14) (1965)
Andy Capp (Nos. 15–20) (1965–1968)
The Cream of Andy Capp (1965) First hardcover collection
Andy Capp: His 21st Book (1968)
Andy Capp (Nos. 22–46) (1969–1982)
Laugh Again with Andy Capp – 23 volumes (1968–1980)
The World of Andy Capp – 16 volumes (1981–1995)
The World of Andy Capp (1990) Titan
Andy Capp in Colour: After a Few (1992) Ravette
Andy Capp in Colour: Don’t Wait Up (1992) Ravette
Andy Capp in Colour: On Cue (1993) Ravette
Andy Capp in Colour: A Barrel of Laughs (1993) Ravette
Andy Capp Through the Ages: 1957–2000 (2000) Syndication International
The New Andy Capp Collection Number 1 (2004) David and Charles Books
The New Andy Capp Collection Number 2 (2005) David and Charles Books
Andy Capp at 50 (2006) David and Charles Books
Andy Capp Annual 2011 (2010) Titan

Australia

Andy Capp, Man of the Moment! (1977) Mirror Books
Down the Hatch, Andy Capp! (1977) Mirror Books
Who's Buying, Andy Capp? (1977) Mirror Books
You’re a Winner, Andy Capp! (1977) Mirror Books
Lots More Andy Capp (1980) Castle Books
Amazing Andy Capp (1981) Castle
Everlovin' Andy Capp (1981) Castle
This Is Your Life, Andy Capp! (1981) Castle
Leave 'Em Laughing, Andy Capp (1982) Castle
Flo & Andy at It Again (1982) Castle
You Little Beauty, Andy Capp (1982) Castle
The Incredible Andy Capp (1982) Castle
We Still Luv You, Andy Capp (1982) Castle
Howzat! Andy Capp (1983) Castle
Laugh at Life with Andy Capp (1983) Castle
Big Mouth Andy Capp (1983) Castle
Summer Fun with Andy Capp (1983) Castle
Amorous Andy Capp (1983) Castle
Good Sport Andy Capp (1983) Castle
Raging Andy Capp (1984) Castle
I Can’t Stand Andy Capp! (1984) Castle
It's a Hard Life, Andy Capp (1984) Castle
Romantic Andy Capp (1984) Horwitz Grahame Books
Strike Again, Andy Capp! (1984) HGB
The New Image Andy Capp (1984) HGB
Nobody's Perfect, Andy Capp (1985) HGB
Down Another, Andy Capp (1986) HGB
The Laid Back Andy Capp (1986) HGB
The Andy and Flo Show (1987) HGB
Educating Andy Capp (1987) HGB
The Liberated Andy Capp (1985) HGB
You’re Fine 'n Dandy, Andy Capp (1987) Budget Books
Sporting Life of Andy Capp (1987) Budget Books
Up the Pub with Andy Capp (1987) Budget Books
Andy Capp: After Hours (1987) Budget Books
Andy Capp: Home Sweet Home (1987) Budget Books
Andy Capp: A Look Inside (1987) Budget Books
Outrageous Andy Capp (1987) HGB
The Return of Andy Capp (1988) HGB
The Trivial Pursuit of Andy Capp (1988) HGB
Good Morning, Andy Capp (1988) HGB
Trouble in Paradise with Andy Capp (1988) HGB
On the Run with Andy Capp (1989) HGB
Taking It Easy with Andy Capp (1989) HGB
Late Again, Andy Capp (1989) HGB
Bounce Back with Andy Capp (1990) HGB
Help Yourself, Andy Capp (1990) HGB

Adaptations

Stage
In 1981 a stage musical based on the strip had a short run at London's Aldwych Theatre, with songs by Alan Price and Trevor Peacock, starring Tom Courtenay as Andy and Val McLane as Florrie. The stage show also produced an original West End cast recording, released on LP record by Key Records in 1982. The musical was reprised in 2016 at the Finborough Theatre in London, with Roger Alborough portraying Andy.

Television

An attempt to transfer Andy Capp to television in 1988 met with little success. The well-known British character actor James Bolam played Andy on ITV. The Thames Television series consisted of six episodes that were shown once and have never been repeated. The series was poorly received and attracted some criticism for the way it played up to supposed stereotypes of Northern working-class men. In 2012 the series was released on DVD (Region 2) in the UK, licensed by Fremantle Media Ltd to the Network Label (VFD64669 / Network 7953656).

Computer game

In 1987, a computer game based on Andy Capp, entitled Andy Capp: The Game, was released for the Commodore 64, ZX Spectrum and Amstrad CPC in Europe and North America. Players had to borrow money in order to replenish Andy's alcohol supply while avoiding fights with his wife Flo and the police.

Around the world
A Konkani language adaptation of the comic strip, known as Anton Chepekar (आंंतोन चेपेंकार) used to feature in the Konkani daily Sunaparant.

Related comics

When the children's comic Buster was launched in 1960, its masthead character was entitled "Buster: Son of Andy Capp". Buster wore a cloth cap similar to Andy's until 1992, but the connection was not recognised in the parent strip and had limited development in the children's comic. Buster often referred to his father, and Andy was seen in the comic attempting to find a gas leak in three frames of the 18 June 1960 strip. He was also shown in two drawn photographs in the 2 July 1960 issue, the first of which was displayed by Buster's mum with the pronouncement "It's a photo of Buster taken with Andy! You can see he's got his dad's fine straight nose". Buster's mum was often referred to by name and was consistently drawn to resemble Andy's wife Flo.

See also
The Lockhorns
The Better Half

References

External links
Andy Capp, British Cartoon Archive, University of Kent
Daily Andy Capp comics at Creators Syndicate
Daily Andy Capp comics at GoComics
Andy's Facebook Page
World of Andy Capp at Twitter
"A comic-hero on his way through Europe" in Nürnberger Nachrichten (newspaper), about Ultras Nürnberg's mascot "Jacky" (=Andy) 
Cigarettes and Alcohol: Andy Capp, extensive article about Reg Smythe and the comic strip, at PlanetSlade
Interview with Andy Capp writer Sean Garnett at The Journalix

British comic strips
British comics characters
Andy Capp
Andy Capp
Fictional English people
Fictional unemployed people
Andy Capp
Andy Capp
Andy Capp
Andy Capp
Andy Capp
Fictional alcohol abusers
Fictional domestic abusers
1957 establishments in England
Daily Mirror